Killcare Heights is a south-eastern suburb of the Central Coast region of New South Wales, Australia on the Bouddi Peninsula. It is part of the  local government area.

Demographics

95.3% of the population only speak English at home, with the most common languages spoken other than English being Mandarin, German and French. The median age of Killcare Heights is 47, significantly above the median age of NSW and Australia, which is 38.

41.4% of the population described themselves as without a religion; 21.1% described themselves as Catholic, and 17.1% as Anglican. Other residents have described themselves as members of the Uniting Church in Australia, Presbyterian church or Pentecostal church.

See also
 Bouddi National Park

Notes

References

Suburbs of the Central Coast (New South Wales)